The Great Pumpkin is a 1993 Italian drama film directed by Francesca Archibugi. It was screened in the Un Certain Regard section at the 1993 Cannes Film Festival, and selected as the Italian entry for the Best Foreign Language Film at the 66th Academy Awards, but was not accepted as a nominee. The film focuses on Valentina, a young girl, sent to a psychiatric clinic.

A literal translation of the title would substitute "watermelon" for "pumpkin"; however, the phrase has pop culture cachet from being an intentional mistranslation of "The Great Pumpkin" from the comic strip, Peanuts.

Plot
Valentina, nicknamed Pippi, is the daughter of two rich spouses. After having had an attack of epilepsy she is admitted to the department of child neuropsychiatry. The doctor who takes care of her is Arturo, who is immediately convinced that the child has these attacks due to psychological and not psychiatric problems and her family is involved.

Cast
 Sergio Castellitto as Arturo
 Anna Galiena as Cinzia Diotallevi, Pippi's mother
 Armando De Razza as Marcello Diotallevi, Pippi's father
 Alessia Fugardi as Valentina 'Pippi' Diotallevi
 Silvio Vannucci as Gianni
 Alessandra Panelli as Fiorella
 Victor Cavallo as Don Annibale
 Laura Betti as Aida
 Maria Consagra as a sick child's mother
 Lidia Broccolino as Laura
 Raffaele Vannoli
 Giacomo Ciarrapico as Giacomo
 Lara Pranzoni
 Tiziana Bianchi
 Andrea Di Giacomo
 Marco Coda
 Giuseppe Giordani
 Gigi Reder as Prof. Turcati

See also
 List of submissions to the 66th Academy Awards for Best Foreign Language Film
 List of Italian submissions for the Academy Award for Best Foreign Language Film 
 List of Italian films of 1993

References

External links

1993 films
1993 drama films
Italian drama films
1990s Italian-language films
Films directed by Francesca Archibugi
1990s Italian films